Orphinus (Orphinus) tabitha, is a species of skin beetle found in South India and Sri Lanka.

Description
Anterior elytral fascia not forming a loop. The terminal antennomere is circular. Setation brown with two narrow transverse bands clothed with white setae. Dorsal elytral integument brown.

References 

Dermestidae
Insects of Sri Lanka
Insects described in 1915